Josef Reithofer (1883–1950) was an Austrian stage and film actor.

Selected filmography
 In the Line of Duty (1917)
 Without Witnesses (1919)
 The Dancer from Tanagra (1920)
 The Princess of the Nile (1920)
 Fanny Elssler (1920)
 The Skull of Pharaoh's Daughter (1920)
 The Frankish Song (1923)
 Gentleman on Time (1924)
 The Tales of Hermann (1926)
 Ludwig II, King of Bavaria (1929)
 Dreyfus (1930)
 The Emperor's Waltz (1933)
 The Young Baron Neuhaus (1934)
 The Two Seals (1934)
 Playing with Fire (1934)
 Love Conquers All (1934)
 Blood Brothers (1935)
 His Late Excellency (1935)
 The Young Count (1935)
 I Was Jack Mortimer (1935)
 Light Cavalry (1935)
 Winter in the Woods (1936)
 A Hoax (1936)
 Der Kaiser von Kalifornien (1936)
 Seven Slaps (1937)
 Meiseken (1937)
 Carousel (1937)
 The Man Who Couldn't Say No (1938)
 The Night of Decision (1938)
 Maria Ilona (1939)
 Robert Koch (1939)
 The Unfaithful Eckehart (1940)
 The Man in the Saddle (1945)
 Anna Alt (1945)
 The Court Concert (1948)

References

Bibliography

External links 
 

Austrian emigrants to Germany
Male actors from Vienna
1883 births
1950 deaths
Austrian male film actors
Austrian male stage actors